Eritettix simplex, known generally as the velvet-striped grasshopper or velvet-striped locust, is a species of slant-faced grasshopper in the family Acrididae. It is found in Central America and North America.

References

Further reading

 

Gomphocerinae
Articles created by Qbugbot
Insects described in 1869